Charles Dellert (March 26, 1882 – October 28, 1981) was an American gymnast. He competed in three events at the 1904 Summer Olympics.

References

External links
 

1882 births
1981 deaths
American male artistic gymnasts
Olympic gymnasts of the United States
Gymnasts at the 1904 Summer Olympics
Sportspeople from Missouri
20th-century American people